Douglas Chapman (born March 27, 1930) was a Canadian ice hockey player with the East York Lyndhursts. He won a silver medal at the 1954 World Ice Hockey Championships in Stockholm, Sweden. He also played with the Oshawa Generals.

References

1930 births
Living people
Canadian ice hockey defencemen
East York Lyndhursts players
Ice hockey people from Toronto
Oshawa Generals players